Hase is a lunar impact crater that is located in the rugged southeast part of the Moon, to the south-southwest of the prominent walled plain Petavius. Palitzsch and Vallis Palitzsch are attached to the northeastern rim of Hase.

The rim of this crater has been damaged and eroded by a long history of subsequent impacts. The most prominent of these is Hase D, a comparably sized crater that has overlain the southern rim, leaving only a low rim between the two formations. Hase A is a small crater that lies in the interior of Hase, near the irregular northern rim. The remainder of the floor is rough and irregular.

To the southeast of Hase D is a system of linear rilles designated Rimae Hase. Their north-western extension transects western part of Hase and Hase D.

Satellite craters
By convention these features are identified on lunar maps by placing the letter on the side of the crater midpoint that is closest to Hase.

References

 
 
 
 
 
 
 
 
 
 
 
 

Impact craters on the Moon